Paul Wühr (10 July 1927 – 12 July 2016) was a German experimental author. Wühr lived by Lake Trasimeno in Umbria, Italy and wrote for the publisher Hanser-Verlag.

Selected works

Novels 

 Gegenmünchen, 1970
 Das falsche Buch, 1983
 Der faule Strick, 1987
 Wenn man mich so reden hört, 1993
 Luftstreiche, 1994
 Was ich noch vergessen habe, 2002

Poems 

 Grüß Gott ihr Mütter ihr Väter ihr Töchter ihr Söhne, 1976
 Rede, 1979
 Sage, 1988
 Salve Res Publica Poetica, 1997
 Venus im Pudel, 2000

Radio plays 

 Das Experiment, 1963
 Wer kann mir sagen, wer Sheila ist?, 1964
 Die Rechnung, 1965
 Fensterstürze, 1968
 Preislied, 1971
 Soundseeing Metropolis München, 1986
 Faschang Garaus, 1988

Textbooks 

 So spricht unsereiner, 1973 (contains texts for the radio plays Preislied, So eine Freiheit, Trip Null, Verirrhaus)

Plays 

 Pyramus und Thisbe, 1986

Awards and prizes 

 1971 – Hörspielpreis der Kriegsblinden
 1984 – Literaturpreis der Stadt Bremen (for his novel Das falsche Buch)
 1990 – Petrarca-Preis
 1997 – Großer Literaturpreis der Bayerischen Akademie der Schönen Künste
 2002 – Hans-Erich-Nossack-Preis.

References

External links 
  

1927 births
2016 deaths
German male writers